Talaat Harb Street (  ) is a historic street in downtown Cairo, Egypt, connecting Tahrir Square and Talaat Harb Square.

Naming
Originally it was named 'Soliman Pasha Street' after Suleiman Pasha, Egypt's French-born General under Muhammad Ali. The street was renamed in 1954 after Talaat Harb, the leading Egyptian economist of the early 1900s. The street received the 'Talaat Harb Street' name during a sweeping effort by Egypt’s new president, Gamal Abdel Nasser, to rid the city of all reminders of the Muhammad Ali dynasty and British occupation era.

Architecture

It is the historic architecture lining Talaat Harb Street that reminds visitors of its stylistic and eventful past. Until its name change in 1954, this avenue was named  'Soliman Pasha Street' and was a center for activity and social interaction among Cairo's upper and European classes. Although a remnant of its former 'Paris on the Nile' 19th century grace, the Midan Talaat, or Talaat Square, at the street's intersection with Qasr el-Nil Street is circled with buildings having the strong elegance of French neoclassical architecture from the Soliman Pasha era, and were once the locations of some of Cairo's most popular and successful shops and services. 

Despite Nasser's attempt to mask colonial Egypt's history, done in the 1950s and 1960s, the structural design of the upper building facades on Talaat Harb Street is a reminder of a multi-colonial past. Various types of architecture representing different eras of Egyptian history are displayed on the floors above the new roughly redesigned yet inviting store facades on street level. Most of these buildings appear to be left over from the days of Khedive Ismail and his goal to create a new European inspired quarter in Cairo during the second half of the 19th century. He who stressed urban planning for the first time in Cairo, to include broad, linear gridded streets, open spaces and parks, geometric balance and harmony, and then modern European architectural styles.  Yet the once grand appearance of these buildings has been lost to the clinging dust, battered shutters and general lack of outward upkeep. Interspersed  between these sad structures are their modern counterparts, which appear significantly more aged than the actual date of the structure would suggest due to their hasty and incomplete construction. Identical glossy storefronts strung together along the street level provide a degree of continuity and collectively sacrifice the history disappearing above them for an eager pursuit of western culture and commerce.

Historic establishments
Groppi
J. Groppi, the once world famous chocolatier, still holds its place in the midan on Talaat Harb Street, without its former global prominence. In the late 1920s Groppi opened a shop in Soliman Pasha square and continued conducting business with Egypt's elite. Established in the early 1900s, Groppi was once "the most celebrated tearoom this side of the Mediterranean"  and was repeatedly the shop of choice for gifts among royalty, including princess Margaret and Elizabeth of England. Miraculously, Groppi narrowly escaped the destruction of Black Saturday and the burning of Cairo in January 1952, although much of this downtown area did not. Perhaps of greater destruction to the Groppi enterprise was its interaction with President Nasser, as he ordered a bomb be placed inside the downtown shop in an effort to promote public insecurity and gain his legitimacy. During the following years Groppi lost its original flavor of successful innovation as expert business practices gave way to the socialism of Nasser's Egypt. Groppi still exists today, with unprofessional staff, a minuscule choice of pastry and drinks, and tables and floors uncleaned for a long time making the establishment into a museum not of its past glory but of Soviet-style mismanagement and contempt of customers.

Egyptian Diplomatic Club
Among this conglomeration of neglected elegance and makeshift renovation stands the glimmering white grandeur of the Egyptian Diplomatic Club at the corner of Talaat Harb and Abdel Salam Araf Street. This club claims to be the center of the diplomatic community in Cairo as it holds meetings and events and publishes a monthly political magazine, The Egyptian Foreign Ministry. This publication promotes the club’s mission; to showcase Egypt’s civilized structure and economic strength and stress its prominent position in the Arab world as an ambassador to the outside world. Such an effort is well suited in its position on Talaat Harb as the street exudes the attitude written on the pages of this magazine: pursuit of economic innovation coupled with a rich mix of cultural influences from the western and eastern world.

Café Riche
Café Riche, a Greek owned establishment founded in 1921, no longer occupies its original space on the midan and has likely been forgotten by most but it was once another hub of social activity in Cairo. Café Riche became a popular venue for many rising performers, among them the celebrated legend Umm Kulthum. It was a frequented locale for some of Cairo's more privileged men. In December 1919 it became the site for an assassination attempt on Egypt's last Coptic Prime Minister, Youssef Wahba Pasha. The assassin had waited for his target inside Café Riche, but his attempt failed. It is in a nearby location.

Public use – demonstrations
 
This mile-long stretch has not only erected history in walls of concrete, but witnessed its movements develop between its roughly defined curbs. At the center of the city, Talaat Harb has been host to countless demonstrations in the nation’s turbulent political past. During one example, in 2005, protesters demonstrating against President Mubarak’s announcement that he would be running for a fifth term of office gathered in Tahrir Square and spilled onto Talaat Harb and into Talaat Harb Square. The demonstration ended in the arrest of 40 persons by plain clothes security officers. This demonstration was led by the grassroots opposition group Kefaya.

Present day
Today the street resembles a healthy vein, pumping full of life toward the heart of the city, Tahrir Square. There is an urgency in the street played out by honking rusted out taxis displaying an unlikely but purposeful array of bumper stickers, which is counterbalanced by the slow swagger of women in gullabayas, girls stalling in front of shop windows stuffed with contorted mannequins displaying the latest fashions and men smoking shisha over a glass of tea while lazily manning a rack of ties.

Within this dynamic market exist a few establishments which seem to have secured a permanent establishment and provide the street with a degree of stability. These companies include, among others, Misr Travel, EgyptAir, and Banque Misr —  which are the ones established by Talaat Harb during his campaign to bolster the Egyptian economy in the 1920s and 1930s.  It seems appropriate for these companies to still provide the economic foundation on Talaat Harb Street, acting as a living testament to the founder—Talaat Harb, as his ideas live on in the remaining buildings on his namesake street.

Though the active splendor that once characterized the street has passed, Talaat Harb Street is an honest reflection of the current reality of Egypt. It has a  blend of Western popular culture and Arab tradition, being enthusiastically consumed by people in an evolving Islamic society. The businesses are trying to develop economic strength in the modern world's marketing aesthetics, while inadvertently ignoring their own rich cultural heritage here in the Talaat Harb Street backdrop of a Euro-Islamic Ottoman era balance and prosperity.

References

External links 

 CULTNAT Center, Egypt: Talaat Harb Street – architecture and buildings resource

Downtown Cairo
Streets in Cairo